The Antwerp University Association (in Dutch: Associatie Universiteit & Hogescholen Antwerpen or AUHA) is a Belgian association for higher education, with members located primarily in Antwerp. The leading institute is the University of Antwerp.

Introduction
The association was founded on September 1, 2003 by 5 founding members.
Typical aspects of the Antwerp Association are:
 regional concentration
 confederal organisation
 active pluralism
 several unique courses (f.e. dance, nautic sciences, new product development)
 large concentration of courses in arts and culture (visual arts, cultural management, dance, drama, filmstudies, music, theatre).

Members
 University of Antwerp, with campuses in Antwerp & Wilrijk
 Artesis Hogeschool Antwerpen, with campuses in Antwerp, Merksem, Lier & Turnhout
 Hogere Zeevaartschool Antwerpen, located in Antwerp
 Karel de Grote-Hogeschool, with campuses in Antwerp, Hoboken & Borgerhout
 Plantijn Hogeschool, with campuses in Antwerp & Boom

References

External links
 Antwerp University Association (Dutch/Flemish)

Education in Antwerp
University of Antwerp
College and university associations and consortia in Europe
2003 establishments in Belgium